Teresa Fay Gibbs (born June 15, 1954) is an American country music artist who is blind. Between 1980 and 2017, she has recorded eleven studio albums, including four for MCA Records and one for Warner Bros. Records. She also charted 13 singles on the Billboard country singles charts in that timespan, including her debut single "Somebody's Knockin'", which reached No. 8 on the country charts, No. 13 on the pop charts and No. 3 on the Adult Contemporary charts. She also entered the country top 20 with "Rich Man", "Mis'ry River", "Ashes to Ashes" and "Anybody Else's Heart but Mine."

Biography
Gibbs was born in Miami, Florida, United States, but raised in the Augusta, Georgia, suburb of Grovetown. Although initially having eyesight, she had been born premature and subsequently lost her eyesight in an incubator accident. In her own words, “I was quite small (2 lbs., 11 ounces) and, so, they had to put me in an incubator. At that point in time, they did not know to cover the eyes and my retinas were damaged.” At six months of age, Gibbs was diagnosed with retrolental fibroplasia and declared blind. She learned to play piano at age three. As a child, she sang in the church choir and at talent contests, and she opened for Bill Anderson at the age of 17. Her parents wanted her to be treated no differently from sighted people, so she was sent to public school and graduated from Butler High School in Augusta in 1972. She performed in and around the Augusta area and eventually, she met Chet Atkins, who advised her to move to Nashville, Tennessee, to pursue a country music career, which she did at age eighteen. After failing to find a record deal, she moved to Miami and joined a band called Sound Dimension. She continued to perform locally, later forming a band called the Terri Gibbs Trio, which performed at a Steak and Ale in Augusta, Georgia. Gibbs then sent a demo tape to record producer Ed Penney of MCA Records, signing to the label in 1980.  Penney was a former Boston disc jockey and a long-time songwriter. He liked her voice on her demo, but he felt she needed stronger material. He co-wrote "Somebody's Knockin'" for her and also produced the song.

Musical career
Gibbs' first single release was "Somebody's Knockin'", which was also the title of her 1981 debut album.  This song was a crossover hit upon its 1980 release, reaching No. 8 on the U.S. country charts, No. 13 on the Billboard Hot 100 and No. 3 on the Adult Contemporary charts.  It was followed by "Rich Man", a No. 19 country hit which also entered the pop charts.  Her debut album won her the Academy of Country Music's Top New Female Vocalist award.  She was also the first winner of the Country Music Association's Horizon Award (which is awarded to emerging artists), and was nominated for a Grammy Award for Best Country Song and Best Female Country Vocal Performance for "Somebody's Knockin'." Gibbs performed on the Grand Ole Opry as well.

MCA released her second album, I'm a Lady, later in 1981.  This album was less successful, although it produced a No. 12 hit in "Mis'ry River," its second and final single. 1982's Some Days It Rains All Night Long produced a Top 20 hit in "Ashes to Ashes" and a No. 45 in its title track.  Also in 1981 and 1982, Gibbs toured with George Jones and sang duets with him onstage.  Her final MCA album, Over Easy, also produced a minor hit in "Anybody Else's Heart but Mine", and after releasing a compilation called The Best of Terri Gibbs, she left the label.

Gibbs switched to Warner Bros. Records for her fifth album, 1985's Old Friends.  All three of this album's singles — "A Few Good Men" (which featured Kathy Mattea on backing vocals) "Rockin' in a Brand New Cradle" and "Someone Must Be Missing You Tonight" — missed the country Top 40.

Gibbs later shifted her focus to Contemporary Christian music, recording Turn Around and Comfort the People in 1987 and 1988, respectively, on Canaan Records.  The former gave Gibbs her second Grammy nomination. What a Great Day, her third Christian album, followed in 1990 on the Morning Gate label.  In 2002, Terri released the album, No Doubt About It, followed by the 2010 release of Your Grace Still Amazes Me. In 2014, The Best Of Terri Gibbs, featuring 10 of her best loved Country hits.  In June 2017, Terri released her sixth Christian album, Sum It All Up.

Personal life 
Gibbs married Grovetown, Georgia, city councilman David Daughtry on April 28, 1988, and remained married to him until his death in February 2008. They had one son, David Wayne Daughtry II, born October 20, 1989.

Awards and honors
Gibbs has won several industry awards. She won Academy of Country Music's Best New Female Vocalist and the Country Music Association's inaugural Horizon Award (for artists rising to new levels of prominence).  Gibbs performed during the Artists Music Guild's 2012 AMG Heritage Awards on November 10, 2012, and upon the completion of her performance she was presented with a Lifetime Achievement Award for her years of dedication to her craft without having any prior knowledge that she would be receiving such honors.

Discography

Albums

Singles

References

External links

1954 births
20th-century American singers
American country keyboardists
American women country singers
American country singer-songwriters
American performers of Christian music
Blind musicians
American blind people
Country musicians from Florida
Living people
MCA Records artists
Musicians from Miami
Singer-songwriters from Florida
Warner Records artists
People from Grovetown, Georgia
20th-century American women singers
Musicians from Augusta, Georgia
Country musicians from Georgia (U.S. state)
21st-century American women
Singer-songwriters from Georgia (U.S. state)